María Álvarez (born 10 October 1989) is a Colombian swimmer. She competed in the women's 200 metre freestyle at the 2019 World Aquatics Championships.

References

External links
 

1989 births
Living people
Colombian female swimmers
Place of birth missing (living people)
Swimmers at the 2015 Pan American Games
Swimmers at the 2019 Pan American Games
Colombian female freestyle swimmers
Pan American Games competitors for Colombia
Competitors at the 2018 South American Games
South American Games medalists in swimming
South American Games silver medalists for Colombia
South American Games bronze medalists for Colombia
21st-century Colombian women